Veronica Lario (born Miriam Raffaella Bartolini, 19 July 1956) is a former Italian actress and the former wife of ex-Italian Prime Minister Silvio Berlusconi.

Biography
Born in Bologna, Lario was a stage actress under Enrico Maria Salerno, with whom she had a love affair. She also worked in theatrical plays with well-known actors; Her most famous role is in Tenebrae by horror master Dario Argento. She retired from acting after meeting Silvio Berlusconi.

Married on 15 December 1990, Berlusconi and Lario have three children together: Barbara Berlusconi (1984), Eleonora (1986), and Luigi (1988). In the 1980s, before the birth of their first-born daughter Barbara, Lario terminated an earlier pregnancy with an induced abortion, in order not to give birth to a child affected by significant morbidity.

As the wife of the Italian premier, Veronica Lario chose to maintain a low public profile. She avoided most public events and meetings and she seldom accompanied her husband Silvio Berlusconi at official meetings. On the other hand, she was known to publicly express political opinions contrasting with those of her then-husband (for example, on bioethics or in backing protesters demonstrating against the war in Iraq).

Lario's husband was never shy about mentioning her on public occasions, and he alluded at least once to a supposed affair between her and philosopher and opposition politician Massimo Cacciari.

On 31 January 2007, Lario said her dignity had been damaged by comments Berlusconi reportedly made during the VIP party after a TV awards ceremony broadcast by one of his channels.

"If I weren't married I would marry you immediately," the 70-year-old media mogul told showgirl and future parliamentarian Mara Carfagna, according to reports widely carried in the Italian press. He reportedly told another, "With you, I'd go anywhere."

Lario's letter appeared in La Repubblica, a nationally prominent newspaper. She declared:

I see these statements as damaging my dignity. To both my husband and the public man, I therefore demand a public apology, since I haven't received any privately. I have faced the inevitable contrasts and the more painful moments that a long conjugal relation entails with respect and discretion.

"Now I write to state my reaction," added Lario, saying her husband's comments were "unacceptable" and could not be reduced to mere jokes.

But after a few hours, Silvio Berlusconi responded with a public letter to his wife and apologized for what he had said three days earlier.

In April 2009 she once more published an open letter, criticising her husband for consorting with young ladies and defining his chosen candidates for the European Parliament as "shameless rubbish".

On 3 May 2009 it was reported that she was to file for divorce, which under Italian law can only be started after a couple has reached a separation agreement. On 10 May 2010 it was revealed that a separation settlement had been reached, with Berlusconi accepting alimony payments of €3.6 million per year, and allowing her to live in their luxury home near Milan.

In December 2012, a Milan court established that Silvio Berlusconi would be required to pay his ex-wife Veronica Lario €3 million a month (€36 million a year).

In 2015 on 23 June 2015, the Court of Justice of Milan established that Silvio Berlusconi would pay his ex-wife €1.4 million a month.

Finally in 2017, on 16 November, the Court of Appeal of Milan decided that Silvio Berlusconi will not have to pay the €1.4 million per month to his ex-wife, who has been ordered to give back the amounts she received since 2014: approximately €60 million.

External links

Notes

1956 births
Living people
Spouses of prime ministers of Italy
Italian film actresses
Italian television actresses
Actors from Bologna
Berlusconi family
Italian stage actresses
20th-century Italian actresses